Hoplopteron terquemi is a species of sea snail, a marine gastropod mollusk in the family Eulimidae. This species, along with Hoplopteron alifera, belongs in the genus, Hoplopteron.

References

External links
 To World Register of Marine Species

Eulimidae
Gastropods described in 1876